Abdelkader Belmokhtar (born 5 March 1987) is an Algerian professional racing cyclist. In 2015 he won the Algerian National Time Trial Championships.

Major results

2007
 2nd Overall Tour des Aéroports
1st Stages 1 & 6
2008
 1st Mountains classification Coupe des nations Ville Saguenay
 6th Tour de Berne
2013
 9th Overall Tour d'Algérie
2015
 1st  Time trial, National Road Championships
 3rd Overall La Tropicale Amissa Bongo
1st  African rider classification
 4th Overall Tour de Constantine
 4th Grand Prix d'Oran
 5th Overall Tour International de la Wilaya d'Oran
 African Games
6th Time trial
8th Road race
 7th Overall Tour d'Annaba
2016
 2nd Critérium International de Sétif
 5th Overall Tour de Blida
 6th Overall Tour de Constantine
2017
 African Road Championships
2nd  Team time trial
10th Road race

References

External links
 

1987 births
Living people
Algerian male cyclists
People from Boufarik
Competitors at the 2015 African Games
21st-century Algerian people